The Mexican gray squirrel (or red-bellied squirrel) (Sciurus aureogaster) is a tree squirrel in the genus Sciurus native to Guatemala and eastern and southern Mexico. It has been introduced to the Florida Keys.

The alternate name should not be confused with the Indonesian red-bellied squirrel (Rubrisciurus rubriventer) or the Asian red-bellied tree squirrel (Callosciurus erythraeus).

Behaviour
Since the introduction of the species to Florida in the late 1930s, its nesting locations have become more irregular, nesting in varying species of trees and even choosing to nest in hurricane debris.

Ecology
Sciurus aureogaster has had an extremely negative impact on Thrinax radiata populations on Elliot Key. It uses palm fibers as nesting materials and consumes the palm itself, often killing the plant.

Subspecies
The two subspecies each have many synonyms associated with them:  
 The subspecies S. a. aureogaster was also known as S. a. chrysogaster, S. a. ferruginiventris, S. a. hypopyrrhus, S. a. hypoxanthus, S. a. leucogaster, S. a. maurus, S. a. morio, S. a. mustelinus, S. a. raviventer and S. a. rufiventris.
 The subspecies S. a. nigrescens was also known as S. a. affinis, S. a. albipes, S. a. cervicalis, S. a. chiapensis, S. a. cocos, S. a. colimensis, S. a. effugius, S. a. frumentor, S. a. griseoflavus, S. a. hernandezi, S. a. hirtus, S. a. leucops, S. a. littoralis, S. a. nelsoni, S. a. nemoralis, S. a. perigrinator, S. a. poliopus, S. a. quercinus, S. a. rufipes, S. a. senex, S. a. socialis, S. a. tepicanus, S. a. varius and S. a. wagneri.

References

External links

Photos of Mexican Gray squirrels in Parque de Los Berros — park in Xalapa, Veracruz state, Mexico.

Mexican gray
Rodents of Central America
Mammals of Mexico
Rodents of North America
Mexican gray squirrel
Mexican gray squirrel
Articles containing video clips